Princisia vanwaerebeki, commonly known as the vibrant hisser, is a species of cockroach in the family Blaberidae, and the only species in the genus Princisia. It is endemic to Madagascar. It is one of several species of cockroach sometimes infected by Blabericola migrator, a parasitic alveolate. It is named in honour of two people: Karlis Princis for the genus name and Daniel van Waerebek, a helminthologist in Antananarivo. Larger specimens are usually male. Females usually live up to three years.

References 

Blaberidae
Insects described in 1973